Anadia steyeri, also known commonly as Steyer's anadia, is a species of lizard in the family Gymnophthalmidae. The species is endemic to Venezuela.

Etymology
The specific name, steyeri, is in honor of a Dr. Steyer of the Naturhistorisches Museum in Lübeck, Germany.

Geographic range
A. steyeri is found in northwestern Venezuela, in the Venezuelan states of Aragua, Carabobo, and Falcón.

Habitat

Reproduction
A. steyeri is oviparous.

References

Further reading
Nieden F (1914). "Beschreibung einer neuen Tejiden-Art nebst Bemerkungen über einige Kriechtiere des Naturhistorischen Museums in Lübeck ". Sitzungsberichte der Gesellschaft Naturforschender Freunde zu Berlin 1914: 364–367.  (Anadia steyeri, new species, pp. 365–366). (in German).
Rivas GA, Sales Nunes PM, Dixon JR, Schargel WE, Caicedo JR, Barros TR, Camargo EG, Barrio-Amorós CL (2012). "Taxonomy, Hemipenial Morphology, and Natural History of Two Poorly Known Species of Anadia (Gymnophthalmidae) from Northern South America". Journal of Herpetology 46 (1): 33–40. (in English, with an abstract in Spanish).

Anadia (genus)
Reptiles described in 1914
Taxa named by Fritz Nieden